Like Us is the fifth full-length studio album by American singer-songwriter Jon McLaughlin. The album was released on October 9, 2015 in the United States. It was preceded by the singles "Before You" and "I Want You Anyway".

Track listing

As confirmed by Amazon.com:

Chart performance

Charts

References

External links
Razor & Tie
Jon McLaughlin's Facebook

Jon McLaughlin albums
2015 albums
Razor & Tie albums